Brent Potter is an Australian politician, representing the electoral division of Fannie Bay in the Northern Territory Legislative Assembly since 20 August 2022.

Career
Before his political career, Potter worked in the Australian Army, during which he was deployed to Afghanistan. He also worked in aged care, defence manufacturing, business development, and as a policy advisor to Natasha Fyles, the Northern Territory's Chief Minister since 13 May 2022. Potter has lived in Darwin since 2009. He has a Master's of Business from the University of New South Wales.

Political career
Former Chief Minister of the Northern Territory Michael Gunner resigned from his seat of Fannie Bay in the Legislative Assembly on 27 July 2022, triggering the 2022 Fannie Bay by-election. The Labor Party revealed Potter as its candidate on 30 July. Potter's now deactivated LinkedIn page showed he had previously worked for an aerospace company which he had helped secure $10 million in public funds from the government.

At the by-election on 20 August, he was elected, withstanding a swing against him.

Personal life
Potter has four children.

References

Members of the Northern Territory Legislative Assembly
Australian Labor Party members of the Northern Territory Legislative Assembly
21st-century Australian politicians
Year of birth missing (living people)
Living people